The Principality of Lichtenberg on the Nahe River was an exclave of the Duchy of Saxe-Coburg-Saalfeld from 1816 to 1826 and the Duchy of Saxe-Coburg and Gotha from 1826 to 1834, when it was sold to the Kingdom of Prussia.  Today its territories lie in two States of Germany – the District of St. Wendel in Saarland and the District of Birkenfeld in Rhineland-Palatinate.

History
Before the French Revolution and the Napoleonic wars, most of the future Principality of Lichtenberg was held by the Dukes of Palatinate-Zweibrücken. The area of St. Wendel was held by the Prince-Bishops of Trier while the Reichsfürsten [Imperial Princes] von Salm, as the Rheingrafen [Counts of the Rhine], had Grumbach and the lands west of it. The rest of the Principality belonged to the Margraves of Baden (as the Counts of Sponheim), the Reichsgrafen [Imperial Counts] von den Leyen, and the Princes of Nassau-Usingen.  But Napoleon and his Grande Armée overran all the Lichtenberger lands, added them to the First French Empire and turned them into the Département de la Sarre. The new Département lasted for 16 years, from 1798 to 1814, until the defeat of Napoleon at the Battle of Waterloo.

Then, at the Congress of Vienna (1815), the left bank of the Rhine went to Bavaria, Hesse and Prussia. Here, the Duke of Saxe-Coburg-Saalfeld, Ernest III, received as the reward for his services as a general in the battles against Napoleon, a large estate of 8.25 square miles and approximately 22,000 residents of St. Wendel and Baumholder, first under the name of Herrschaft Baumholder. On 11 September 1816 the possession was made official.

By the decree of Ernest III, the Duke of Saxe-Coburg-Saalfeld, on 6 March 1819, the area would be renamed as the Principality of Lichtenberg after the Lichtenberg Castle (between Baumholder and Kusel).

St. Wendel was the seat of government. It was also the residence of Louise of Saxe-Gotha-Altenburg (Duchess of Saxe-Coburg-Saalfeld), who lived there from 1824 until her death in 1831. Divorced in 1826, she was the mother of Prince Ernest, the future Duke of Saxe-Coburg and Gotha, and Prince Albert, the future husband of Queen Victoria, who both spent some of their childhood in St. Wendel.

In 1817, the territories were divided into three cantons and 15 Burgermeistereien [mayoralties].

In 1826, the Principality of Lichtenberg went from one duchy to another, during the extensive rearrangement of the Ernestine duchies and Ernest III, the Duke of Saxe-Coburg-Saalfield, became Ernest I, the Duke of Saxe-Coburg and Gotha.

But, because of the political unrest on 31 May 1834 in St. Wendel and the great distance from the rest of the Duchy, the Duke, Ernest I, sold the Principality to Prussia on 15 August 1834 for the annuity of 80,000 talers. Most of the proceeds were used for the expansion of the ducal possessions in Grein (Upper Austria). The Kingdom of Prussia annexed the lands as Kreis [District of] St. Wendel in the Regierungsbezirk [Administrative Division of] Trier of the Rheinprovinz [Province of the Rhineland].

Territories
 Area: 537 km² (207.34 mi²)
 Population: ca. 25,000
 Communities: There were about a hundred municipalities in the Principality.

Today the territories are in the following States of Germany:

In the Saarland

 The City of St. Wendel without, until 1947, the Palatinate localities of Bubach, Hoof, Marth, Niederkirchen, Osterbrücken and Saal;
 The Municipality of Freisen without the localities of Asweiler and Eitzweiler;
 The Municipality of Marpingen without the locality of Berschweiler;
 The Municipality of Namborn without the locality of Hirstein;
 The Municipality of Oberthal without the locality of Steinberg-Deckenhardt;
 From the City of Ottweiler, the ward of Fürth with Wetschhausen, Mainzweiler and Steinbach.

In Rhineland-Palatinate:
 The whole Verbandsgemeinde (municipal association of) Baumholder;
 all the now-defunct municipalities in the area of the military training base of Baumholder;
 From the city of Idar-Oberstein, the wards of Hammerstein, Kirchen-, Mittel- and Nahbollenbach as well as Weierbach;
 From the Verbandsgemeinde Herrstein, the Municipalities of Dickesbach, Mittelreidenbach, Oberreidenbach, Schmidthachenbach, Sien (with Sienerhöfe), Sienhachenbach;
 From the Verbandsgemeinde Kusel, the local municipalities of Pfeffelbach, Reichweiler, Ruthweiler and Thallichtenberg (with Burglichtenberg);
 From the Verbandsgemeinde Lauterecken, the Municipalities of Buborn, Deimberg, Grumbach, Hausweiler, Herren-Sulzbach, Homberg, Kappeln, Kirrweiler, Langweiler, Merzweiler, Niederalben, Unterjeckenbach and Wiesweiler
 From the local municipality of Offenbach-Hundheim, the locality of Offenbach and 
 From the local municipality of Glanbrücken, the locality of Niedereisenbach.

Government
 Christoph Arzberger (1772-1822), astronomer, educator, professor of mathematics at the Gymnasium Casimirianum in Coburg, Privy Councilor and President of the Administration of the Principality of Lichtenberg 1821-1822 and Kammerpräsident [President of the Cabinet] of Saxe-Coburg-Saalfeld 1821-1822

References

Bibliography
  Gerhard Köbler, Historisches Lexikon der Deutschen Länder: die deutschen Territorien vom Mittelalter bis zur Gegenwart [Historical Dictionary of the German States:  The German Territories from the Middle Ages to the Present] (Munich:  Verlag C.H. Beck, 2007), p. 375.
  Friedrich August Lottner, Sammlung der für das Fürstenthum Lichtenberg vom Jahre 1816 bis 1834 ergangenen herzoglich Sachsen-Coburg-Gothaischen Verordnungen [Collection of the Orders Issued to the Principality of Lichtenberg between the years 1816 and 1834 by the Ordinances of the Duchy of Saxe-Coburg-Gotha] (Berlin:  Sandersche Buchhandlung [Sander Bookshop], 1836) (Google Books)

External links
  Bibliography about the Principality of Lichtenberg in the  Saarländischen Bibliographie [Bibliography of the Saarland]

Former states and territories of Rhineland-Palatinate